Ecdyonurus criddlei, the little slate-winged dun, is a species of flatheaded mayfly in the family Heptageniidae. It is found in Central America, North America. In North America its range includes southwestern Canada, northern Mexico, the western United States, and Hawaii.

References

Further reading

 

Mayflies
Articles created by Qbugbot
Insects described in 1927